Matt Unicomb (born 21 January 1985) is an Australian former professional basketball player who played for the West Sydney Razorbacks in the Australian National Basketball League and Den Helder in the Dutch League.

In March 2018, Matt began playing out of Fitzrovia, London.

References

1985 births
Living people
Australian men's basketball players
Guards (basketball)
People educated at St Aloysius' College (Sydney)
West Sydney Razorbacks players